Aurangabad division is one of the six administrative divisions of Maharashtra state in India. It represents the Marathwada region of Maharashtra.

Districts
 Aurangabad
 Beed
 Jalna
 Latur
 Hingoli
 Parbhani 
 Osmanabad 
 Nanded

References

maharashtra.gov.in

 
Divisions of Maharashtra
Marathwada
Hyderabad State